HOn3 gauge represents the modelling of  gauge railways in HO scale, resulting in a model track gauge of  (the same as H0m and TT scale).  Trains are operated using direct current or Digital Command Control over realistic-looking two-rail track.

Railways that use the  gauge can be found in New Zealand, South Africa, Indonesia, Australia, Taiwan, Japan and others.  

Manufacturers of Australian outline models in this size include Haskell Models, Wuiske Models, Black Diamond, PGC, Southern Rail and SDS Models. The main focus for Australian narrow gauge modelling has been the large Queensland railway system. More recent releases have included Tasmanian and Western Australian prototypes. In New Zealand, the scale has a few niche manufactures.

CMD models and SARModel produce South African and Zimbabwean (Rhodesia Railways) HOn3 models.  

Most Japanese and Taiwanese HO scale models are made to run on 16.5mm gauge track and are made to 1:80 scale (Tomix, Kato and Tenshodo for Japan being the main brands and Haskell for Taiwan) but some small volume HOn3.5 kits and brass models are made for Japan with Imon being a major supplier.

Related scales 
In the same scale standard-gauge trains are modelled on  gauge track, known as HO scale. Sn3½ is also used to represent , as the gauge is the same as HO scale. HOm uses the same 12mm gauge track to represent metre-gauge (3ft3.37in) railways. H0f gauge uses  to represent 2 ft and 600 mm gauge railways.

See also
 List of narrow-gauge model railway scales
 Rail transport modelling scales
 List of rail transport modelling scale standards

References 

Model railroad scales
Narrow gauge railway modelling